Tobias Ludvigsson (born 22 February 1991) is a Swedish cyclist who currently rides for UCI ProTeam .

Career
As a junior Ludvigsson won several national titles, both on the road and in mountain biking. In 2009, he was eighth in the junior world road race championship.

In mid-2011 he was offered a training contract at the  team. Soon after, Ludvigsson was offered a professional contract with the team for two years.

He is the older brother of Fredrik Ludvigsson. He was named in the start list for the 2016 Giro d'Italia, where he were able to hold the white jersey in the Young rider classification for three stages. In July 2018, he was named in the start list for the Tour de France.

Major results

2008
 National Junior Mountain Bike Championships
1st  Time trial
1st  Cross country
1st  Team relay
 1st  Time trial, National Junior Road Championships
2009
 1st  Time trial, National Junior Road Championships
 1st Junior Kinnekulleloppet
 5th Overall Junior Tour de Himmelfart
 8th Road race, UCI Junior World Championships
2010
 2nd Overall Tour of Jamtland
 3rd Overall Hammarö 3-dagars
1st Stage 2
2011
 1st Overall Hammarö 3-dagars
1st Stages 1 & 3
 1st Prologue Tour de Normandie
 1st Stage 4 Thüringen Rundfahrt der U23
 4th Overall Olympia's Tour
 5th La Côte Picarde
 6th Himmerland Rundt
2012
 2nd Time trial, National Road Championships
 3rd Overall Tour of Hainan
 4th Västboloppet
2013
 1st Västboloppet
 2nd Time trial, National Road Championships
 2nd Overall Driedaagse van West-Vlaanderen
1st  Young rider classification
 3rd Overall Circuit de la Sarthe
1st  Young rider classification
2014
 1st  Overall Étoile de Bessèges
1st  Young rider classification
1st Stage 5 (ITT)
 5th Overall Tour Méditerranéen
2015
 National Road Championships
3rd Road race
5th Time trial
2016
 2nd Time trial, National Road Championships
 Giro d'Italia
Held  after Stages 1–3
2017
 1st  Time trial, National Road Championships
2018
 National Road Championships
1st  Time trial
2nd Road race
2019
 National Road Championships
1st  Time trial
2nd Road race
 2nd Overall Étoile de Bessèges
 9th Overall Tour de Wallonie
2020
 2nd Time trial, National Road Championships
2021
 National Road Championships
3rd Time trial
5th Road race
2022 
 National Road Championships
2nd Road race
3rd Time trial

Grand Tour general classification results timeline

References

External links

1991 births
Living people
People from Huskvarna
Swedish male cyclists
Sportspeople from Jönköping County